Kalispell City Airport  is a city-owned public-use airport located one nautical mile (1.85 km) south of the central business district of Kalispell, a city in Flathead County, Montana, United States. This airport is included in the FAA's National Plan of Integrated Airport Systems for 2009–2013, which categorized it as a general aviation facility.

Facilities and aircraft 
It has one runway designated 13/31 with an asphalt surface measuring 3,600 by 60 feet (1,097 x 18 m).

For the 12-month period ending August 25, 2005, the airport had 41,400 aircraft operations, an average of 113 per day: 80% general aviation, 16% air taxi, and 5% military. At that time there were 68 aircraft based at this airport: 82% single-engine, 6% multi-engine, 10% helicopter and 2% ultralight.

References

External links 
 Kalispell City Airport at City of Kalispell website
 Aerial image as of 1 July 1990 from USGS The National Map
 

Airports in Montana
Buildings and structures in Flathead County, Montana
Transportation in Flathead County, Montana
Kalispell, Montana